

Credits

Starring: 
 James Hazeldine as Tom Crane
 Louise Jameson as Dr. Anne Reynolds
 John Carlisle as Dr. Roy Martindale

Recurring: 
 Brown Derby as Scott-Erskine (eps. 1, 3-4, 6, 8-10)
 Natasha Gerson as Morag (eps. 1-5)
 Nicholas Coppin as Michael Crane (eps. 1-3, 5, 8)

Series Created by: Jack Gerson
Producer: George Gallaccio
Title Music: Anthony Isaac
Script Editor: Maggie Allen

This is a list of all The Omega Factor episodes.

Episode list

Omega Factor, The